Linitis plastica is a widely used term for Brinton's disease (also known as leather bottle stomach), a morphological variant of diffuse (or infiltrating) stomach cancer. In some texts, the term is also used to describe the condition of a rigid, non-distensible stomach which may be caused by a non-malignant condition such as a caustic injury to the stomach.

Linitis plastica is a type of adenocarcinoma and accounts for 3–19% of gastric adenocarcinomas. Causes of cancerous linitis plastica are commonly primary gastric cancer, but in rarer cases could be metastatic infiltration of the stomach, particularly breast and lung carcinoma. It is not associated with H. pylori infection or chronic gastritis. The risk factors are undefined, except for rare inherited mutations in E-cadherin. The hereditary form of this cancer, hereditary diffuse gastric cancer, accounts for only 1–3% of gastric adenocarcinomas. Somatic mutations in this gene are found in about 50% of diffuse-type gastric carcinomas.

Signs and symptoms

Diffuse stomach cancer is characterized by the presence of poorly differentiated tumor cells. Under a microscope, these appear as signet ring cells, meaning that mucin droplets are visible that displace the nucleus to one side.

Symptoms of linitis plastica do not usually present until the disease is in an advanced stage, making early diagnosis difficult. Symptoms are similar to those of stomach cancer including: difficulty swallowing, weight loss, indigestion, and vomiting.

Notable cases
Napoleon Bonaparte and many members of his family are thought to have died from this type of cancer, although it is believed by others that he may have died from arsenic poisoning.

References

External links 

"Carcinoma of the Stomach." at patient.info

Gastrointestinal cancer